The Church of St. Winifred is a church in Kingston on Soar, Nottinghamshire.

It is part of an informal grouping of five churches that are known collectively as "The 453 Churches" as they straddle the A453. The other churches in the group are:
St. Lawrence's Church, Gotham
St. George's Church, Barton in Fabis
Holy Trinity Church, Ratcliffe-on-Soar
All Saints’ Church, Thrumpton

History

The church is a Grade I Listed building. Major restoration took place in 1900. A plaque inside the church reads The nave, aisle and tower of this church were erected and the chancel and chancel aisle restored A.D.1900 by Henry Lord Belper in memory of his son William Strutt born Feb.8th. 1875, died Oct.5th 1898.

Incumbents
Until 1538 the parish church was Ratcliffe. It had rectors while Norton Priory was patron, then vicars when Burscough became patron. At the time when Kingston became a separate parish, the last priest put forward by Burscough was vicar. The priest appointed in 1543 was under crown patronage.

1239 W. de Shendon
1270 Henry de Halton
1292 Richard de Hertford
1326 Walter de Alleford
1331 John Gerard
1342 Walter de Melburn
???? Robert de Treford
1352 John de Ditton
1359 Henry de Blakeburn
???? John de Kyneton
1385 Thomas de Basford
1391 Richard Gower
???? Richard Balle
1416 Richard de Wynwicke
???? John Ray
1419 William Hickson
???? William Wilms
1429 Hugo Beton
???? Richard Ives
1450 Laurence Whalley
1461 James Allerton
1471 John Buttiler
1478 John Prescot
1497 Henry Riding
1497 Hector Riding
1509 Thomas Wynter
1543 John Rolston
1553 Christopher Edwards
1650 Richard Hickman
1679 Robert Holmes
1856 Pattenson
1856 J.F. Bateman
1862 W.Rumman
???? W.Reynard
1875 Orlando Spencer Smith
1879 Edward Stuart Taylor
1882 Henry Balfour Hamilton
1909 Richard Owen Jones
1932 Charles Herbert Vincent Brown
1935 Harry Norman Wrigley
1938 Philip Harper New
1943 Bernard Parker Hall
1947 John Frederick Theodore Martin
1952 Cyril Brailsford
1954 Ieuan Merchant Williams
1962 John William Mayer
1967 Raymond Samuel Foster
1969 Norman Copeland
1971 Alfred Donald Williams
1981 Robert Lewis McCullough
1985 Waller Brian Brendan Magill
1996 Richard Spray
2002 Stephen Osman
2011 Richard Coleman

Organ

The church has a two manual pipe organ by Wilkinsons of Kendal. It was originally installed in Holy Trinity Church, Mardale Green and installed here in 1936 when that church was demolished as part of the Haweswater Reservoir construction scheme. A specification of the organ can be found on the National Pipe Organ Register.

Bells

The church has six bells, the Tenor bell weighs nine and three quarter hundredweight.

See also

Grade I listed buildings in Nottinghamshire

External links
 Southwell & Nottingham church history project
British Listed Buildings Church of St. Winifred

References

Church of England church buildings in Nottinghamshire
Grade I listed churches in Nottinghamshire